Tonny is a 1962 Norwegian drama film.

Tonny may also refer to:

Places
 , a village in the province of Luxembourg, Belgium

Name
Tonny (name)

See also

 Tinny (disambiguation)
 Toney (disambiguation)
 Tonn (disambiguation)
 Tonna (disambiguation)
 Tonne (disambiguation)
 Tony (disambiguation)
 Tunny (disambiguation)
Torny Pedersen